Chukwuma Julian "Chuma" Okeke (born August 18, 1998) is an American professional basketball player for the Orlando Magic of the National Basketball Association (NBA). Okeke played college basketball for the Auburn Tigers before being drafted 16th overall in the 2019 NBA draft by the Orlando Magic.

High school career
Okeke attended Westlake High School in Atlanta. As a junior, he won the Georgia Class 6A state championship, scoring 13 points in a 68–58 win over Pebblebrook High School. Okeke was named Mr. Georgia Basketball after his senior season, after he averaged 24.4 points, 15 rebounds and 2.4 steals per game. He was a consensus four-star recruit and was ranked among the top 50 players in his class by some scouting services.

College career
Okeke played with the Tigers of Auburn University. 

In his freshman season, Okeke averaged 7.5 points and 5.8 rebounds per game. He grabbed 197 rebounds in the season, the most by an Auburn freshman since Jeff Moore in 1984–85.

As a sophomore, Okeke averaged 12 points, 6.8 rebounds, 1.8 steals, and 1.2 blocks per game while starting in all 38 games. On March 29, 2019, in a Sweet 16 win over top-seeded North Carolina at the 2019 NCAA tournament, he tore his ACL and was injured for the rest of the tournament. Despite his absence, Auburn advanced to its first Final Four appearance in program history.

Professional career

Orlando Magic (2020–present) 
On June 20, 2019, Okeke was selected with the 16th overall pick by the Orlando Magic in the 2019 NBA draft. Okeke was considered to be a lottery pick in the draft, but after suffering an ACL injury in the 2019 NCAA tournament, he fell to the 16th selection by the Magic, and was referred to by ESPN analyst, Mike Schmitz as the "steal of the draft."

During his rehab, Okeke signed a one-year G League contract with the Magic's affiliate in Lakeland with the intent of starting his rookie-scale contract in 2020. At the time, the Magic faced a salary cap crunch that prevented them from adding Okeke's rookie salary to their books.  He reported to Lakeland's training camp as a draft rights player on October 28, 2019. However, Okeke never played a game with Lakeland.

On November 16, 2020, the Orlando Magic announced that they had signed Okeke. In a preseason game against the Atlanta Hawks, Okeke recorded 9 points with 2 three-pointers. On March 26, 2021, Okeke scored a career-high 22 points on 60 percent shooting from the field in a 105-112 loss over the Portland Trail Blazers. Okeke averaged over 12 points after the trade deadline before suffering a season-ending minor ankle injury against the Cleveland Cavaliers.

Career statistics

Regular season 

|-
| style="text-align:left;"| 
| style="text-align:left;"| Orlando
| 45 || 19 || 25.2 || .417 || .348 || .750 || 4.0 || 2.2 || 1.1 || .5 || 7.8
|-
| style="text-align:left;"| 
| style="text-align:left;"| Orlando
| 70 || 20 || 25.0 || .376 || .318 || .846 || 5.0 || 1.7 || 1.4 || .6 || 8.6
|- class="sortbottom"
| style="text-align:center;" colspan="2"| Career
| 115 || 39 || 25.1 || .390 || .326 || .810 || 4.6 || 1.9 || 1.3 || .6 || 8.3

College

|-
| style="text-align:left;"| 2017–18
| style="text-align:left;"| Auburn
| 34 || 0 || 21.6 || .458 || .391 || .673 || 5.8 || 1.1 || .7 || .7 || 7.5
|-
| style="text-align:left;"| 2018–19
| style="text-align:left;"| Auburn
| 38 || 38 || 29.1 || .496 || .387 || .722 || 6.8 || 1.9 || 1.8 || 1.2 || 12.0
|- class="sortbottom"
| style="text-align:center;" colspan="2"| Career
| 72 || 38 || 25.5 || .481 || .389 || .703 || 6.3 || 1.5 || 1.3 || 1.0 || 9.9

Personal life
Okeke's father Chuka Okeke is from Nigeria.

References

External links
 
 Auburn Tigers bio

1998 births
Living people
American men's basketball players
American sportspeople of Nigerian descent
Auburn Tigers men's basketball players
Basketball players from Atlanta
Orlando Magic draft picks
Orlando Magic players
Power forwards (basketball)